The 2009 Welsh Labour leadership election was held following the resignation of Rhodri Morgan, who stepped down after nine years as First Minister of Wales. Morgan had made clear his intent to resign in 2009 as far back as 2005. As Morgan had been elected unopposed in 2000, this was the first contested election for the Welsh Labour leadership for more than a decade.

The contest concluded on 1 December 2009 and was won on the first round by Carwyn Jones who won in all three sections of the ballot. As Welsh Labour was the senior partner in a Labour/Plaid Cymru coalition government, Jones was confirmed as First Minister the following week assumed office as First Minister on 10 December 2009. Both Edwina Hart and Huw Lewis served in Jones' governments until their retirement in 2016.

Under Jones, Labour would go on to take office alone as a minority government following the 2011 Assembly election, and retain office following the 2016 Assembly election.

Jones stood down in late 2018, triggering a new election.

Voting system

The election was conducted under an Electoral College system in which Labour Party members, affiliated trade union members and Welsh Labour elected officials all held an equal share of the votes.

Candidates

To stand, candidates needed the support of a minimum of six (out of a possible 24) including themselves of Labour's Assembly Members.

Three candidates - Counsel General Carwyn Jones, Health Minister Edwina Hart and Merthyr Tydfil and Rhymney AM Huw Lewis - entered the race.

The following were reported as endorsements by the BBC at the close on nominations on 22 October 2009:

Derek Vaughan MEP supported Carwyn Jones.

Results

See also

2018 Welsh Labour Party deputy leadership election

References

2009
2009 in Wales
Welsh Labour leadership election